Bob Hewitt and Frew McMillan were the defending champions, but lost in the quarterfinals this year.

Wojtek Fibak and Tom Okker won the title, defeating Brian Gottfried and Raúl Ramírez 6–3, 6–3 in the final.

Seeds

Draw

Finals

Top half

Bottom half

External links
 Main draw

Stockholm Open
1977 Grand Prix (tennis)